Tanya Stefanova-Koleva (born March 8, 1972) is a female pole vaulter from Bulgaria, who represented her native country at two consecutive Summer Olympics, starting in 2000 in Sydney, Australia. She set her personal best (4.45 metres) on June 21, 2003 at a meet in Velenje.

Achievements

References

1972 births
Living people
Bulgarian female pole vaulters
Athletes (track and field) at the 2000 Summer Olympics
Athletes (track and field) at the 2004 Summer Olympics
Olympic athletes of Bulgaria